Deutsche Wirtschaftsbetriebe, abbreviated DWB, was a project launched by Nazi Germany in World War II. Organised and managed by the Allgemeine SS, its aim was to profit from the use of slave labour extracted from the Nazi concentration camp inmates.

Holding company for SS industries 

DWB was a holding company for more than 25 SS industries.  Oswald Pohl, the head of the SS Main Economic and Administrative Office (known by its German initials as WVHA) was also the chief officer of DWB.  Georg Lörner, another high WVHA official, was another incorporator.   Through stock ownership DWB controlled a wide variety of enterprises, such as stone quarries, brick manufacturing plants, cement mills, pharmaceutical factories, real estate, housing, building materials, book printing and binding, porcelain and ceramics, mineral water and fruit juices, furniture, foodstuffs, and textiles and leather. Some of these businesses and properties had previously been seized or otherwise expropriated from their rightful owners.

The following companies were part of the holding (sorted in groups):

Group Construction materials, Ceramics und Porzellan
Deutschen Erd- und Steinwerke GmbH (DEST)
Ostindustrie GmbH (OSTI)
Pragobau AG
Golleschauer Portlandzementfabrik AG
Ostdeutschebaustoffwerke GmbH
Zettlitzer Kaolinwerke AG
Schlackenwerk Linz GmbH
Porzellanmanufaktur Allach
Porzellanfabrik Victoria GmbH
Tonwerke Großes Werder GmbH
Essin GmbH
Porag Porzellan-Radiatorenwerk GmbH
Bohemia Keramische Werke AG
Deutsche Torfverwertung GmbH
Klinker-Zement GmbH

Group Food and Beverages
Deutsche Lebensmittel GmbH
Selchwaren- und Konservenfabrik AG
Salami und Nahrungsmittelfabrik AG
Freudentaler Getränke GmbH
F. Kunerle ohG
Deutsche Versuchsanstalt für Ernährung und Verpflegung GmbH
Societä Anonima Prodotti Agricoli Vitaminici Apuania
Lesnoplod Orava Sojka a Spol 
Mattoni (Mineralwasser)
Apollinaris (Mineralwasser)
Sudetenquell GmbH

Group Paper, Printing and Publishing
Papierfabrik Neudeck AG
SS-Druckschriftenversand GmbH
Forschungsanstalt für das Deutsche Buchwesen GmbH
Lumbeck-Gesellschaft für das deutsche Buchwesen mbH
SS-Vordruck-Verlag GmbH 
Völkischer Kunstverlag GmbH
Großdeutscher Bilderdienst GmbH
Friedrich Franz Bauer GmbH 
Deutsche Briefkasten-Reklame GmbH 
Nordland-Verlag

Group Settlement and Infrastructure
Gesellschaft für technisch-wirtschaftliche Entwicklung mbH (Getewent) 
Siedler Wirtschaftsgemeinschaft Zamosc GmbH 
Allod Eigenheim-und Kleinsiedlungs GmbH 
Erste Gemeinnützige Baugesellschaft für Kleinwohnungen GmbH
Haus-und Grundbesitz GmbH
Gemeinnützige Wohnungs- und Heimstättengesellschaft mbH (Dachau)

Group Textil and Glas
Gesellschaft für Textil- und Lederverwertung mbH (Texled) 
Rheinahr-Glasfabrik GmbH

Group Furniture and Interior
Deutsches Sperrholz- und Fournierwerk GmbH 
Verkaufsstelle Berliner Möbelwerkstätten eGmbH 
Deutschen Ausrüstungswerke GmbH (DAW)
Deutsche Meisterwerkstätten GmbH
Deutsche Heimgestaltung GmbH
Deutsche Edelmöbel GmbH

Groupe other Enterprises
Gesellschaft für Seuchenbekämpfung mbH 
Asid GmbH
Deutsche Heilmittel GmbH 
Anton Loibl GmbH
Deutsche Schieferöl GmbH, siehe auch Unternehmen Wüste

Role in war crimes 

After World War II, the surviving chief officers of WVHA were on trial for crimes against humanity in what became known as Pohl trial.  Most of them were found guilty.   Both Pohl and Georg Lörner were sentenced to death by hanging, although Lörner managed to get his sentence commuted to a prison term.  The war crimes tribunal placed particular emphasis on the role the defendants had played in four DWB subsidiaries:
 German Earth and Stone Works, known as DEST, which operated five granite quarries, six brick and tile plants, and a stone-cutting plant;
 The Klinker-Zement, manufacturing brick and cinder block, fireproof products, ceramics, lime, and chalk. This company had large subsidiaries at Golleschau, Prague, Lvov, and Białystok;
 Ostindustrie, or OSTI, organized in March 1943 and dissolved a year later, which, using forced Jewish labor operated all confiscated Jewish industries in German-occupied Poland, including foundries, textile plants, quarries, glass works, and others.
 The German Equipment Works or DAW, which operated various industries in seven concentration camps. 
DEST in particular became notorious for exploitation under brutal conditions of the labor of concentration camp inmates at Mauthausen-Gusen concentration camp in Austria.

Notes

Works cited

Further reading 
 Nicosia, Francis R., and Huener, Jonathan, Business and Industry in Nazi Germany, University of Vermont Center for Holocaust Studies Berghahn Books, 2004 
 Sofsky, Wolfgang, The order of terror : the concentration camp, Princeton University Press, 1996 

Unfree labor during World War II
SS Main Economic and Administrative Office
Companies involved in the Holocaust